Kim Dolstra is a Dutch football defender, currently playing for Medkila IL. She previously played in the Eredivisie for Fortuna Wormerveer, AZ, Telstar, ADO Den Haag and AGSM Verona in Italy's women's Serie A. She was awarded the 2010 championship's Golden Shoe after winning her third championship in a row with AZ.

As an Under-19 international she played the 2006 U-19 European Championship. On 6 March 2013, she made her debut for the Dutch national team, in the 2013 Cyprus Cup match against Finland.

Honours
AZ
 Eredivisie (women) (3): 2007–08, 2008–09, 2009–10
 KNVB Women's Cup (2): 2006, 2011

References

External links
 

1988 births
Living people
Dutch women's footballers
Netherlands women's international footballers
Footballers from Amsterdam
Expatriate women's footballers in Italy
Eredivisie (women) players
Serie A (women's football) players
AZ Alkmaar (women) players
Telstar (women's football club) players
ADO Den Haag (women) players
A.S.D. AGSM Verona F.C. players
Stjarnan women's football players
Women's association football defenders
Dutch expatriate women's footballers
Dutch expatriate sportspeople in Iceland
Dutch expatriate sportspeople in Norway
Dutch expatriate sportspeople in Italy
Expatriate women's footballers in Iceland
Expatriate women's footballers in Norway